The Congress of the State of Yucatán (Spanish: Congreso del Estado de Yucatán), or simply the Congress of Yucatán, is the legislative branch of the government of the State of Yucatán. The Congress is the governmental deliberative body of Yucatán, which is equal to, and independent of, the executive. The Congress of Yucatán is a unicameral legislature.

The current session of the Congress consists of 25 deputies (15 elected by the first-past-the-post system and 10 by proportional representation). Deputies are elected to serve for a three-year term with the possibility of re-election for an additional term.

Since its installation the congress has been renewed 62 times; the current congress, elected in 2018, is known as the LXII Legislature of the Congress of Yucatán.

Composition 
The 62nd Legislature of the Congress of Yucatán consists of the following political parties:

See also
List of Mexican state congresses

External links
  (In Spanish)

Yucatán, Congress of
Yucatán
Government of Yucatán